The Madras States Agency was an  agency of India. Founded in 1923, it consisted of these five princely states (by precedence) :
 Travancore, ruled by a Maharaja with a hereditary salute of 19-guns;
 Cochin, ruled by a Maharaja with a hereditary salute of 17-guns;
 Pudukkottai, ruled by a Raja with a hereditary salute of 11-guns;
 Banganapalle, ruled by a Nawab with a hereditary salute of 9-guns;
 Sandur, a non-salute state ruled by a Raja.

History 
Prior to 1923, the five states have been subject to the government of the Madras Presidency which was represented in each state by a resident usually the District Collector of a neighbouring Madras district. When in 1923, all the states were brought under the direct control of the Government of India, the individual residencies were abolished and replaced with a single unitary agency responsible to the Governor-General of India.

The agent was based in Trivandrum, the capital of Travancore. He supervised the foreign relations of the princely states and their relationship with the Central government in New Delhi.

The agency was abolished when India became independent in 1947. Between 1947 and 1950, the Madras states with the exception of Travancore and Cochin were merged with the neighbouring districts of Madras Province.

Chief officers

Agents

Residents 
On 1 April 1937, the Madras States Agency was converted into a residency and on 1 January 1939, the princely states of Banganapalle and Sandur were transferred to the Mysore Residency.

References 

Agencies of British India

1923 establishments in India
1920s establishments in British India
1948 disestablishments in India